Elections to the Falkirk District Council took place in May 1992, alongside elections to the councils of Scotland's various other districts.

Aggregate results

References

1992 Scottish local elections
Falkirk Council elections